The Flora Theater is a small 18th-century performing arts theater located in the Palazzo dei Priori in center of the town of Penna San Giovanni, province of Macerata, region of Marche, Italy.

History

The nucleus for the theater was formed by a Società del Teatro, founded in 1780, and composed of ten condomini (owners) in the town. They utilized this space in the town palace to built this theater with a frescoed wooden roof, above ground seating and two floors of theater boxes. The decoration is an elaborate rococo décor on wood, with wooden columns painted as faux marble. The theater presently sits about 100 persons. In the twentieth century, for years the theater was abandoned and threatened with destruction. In 1985 it was designated as a historic national treasure and recently subsequently restored.

The painted decoration was completed Antonio Liozzi, who painted the central ceiling fresco of the goddess Flora, as well as the mouldings and frames.

References

Buildings and structures in the Province of Macerata
Theatres in le Marche
Theatres completed in 1780
Neoclassical architecture in le Marche
18th-century architecture in Italy